Altaf Qadri is a Kashmiri photojournalist presently working with the Associated Press.

Life and work
Qadri was born in Srinagar, the summer capital of Indian-administered Kashmir. He had his first freelance assignment in 2001, and was then a staff photographer for a local newspaper. In 2003, he joined the European Pressphoto Agency, for which he provided extensive coverage of the Kashmir conflict before joining the Associated Press in 2008.

Awards
Second prize in the International News Pictures Story Category in the 'Best of Photojournalism 2005" by National Press Photographers Association (NPPA)
His picture of Kashmir village children playing cricket won the First prize in Sports Action and Feature category in the India Press Photo 2006 competition by The Indian Express Ramnath Goenka Foundation.
2007: Special Jury Prize (with seven others), Days Japan International Photojournalism Awards, for a picture story about the conflict in Kashmir, Kashmir: Paradise in Pain.
First Prize in "One Weeks Work" category by Pictures of the Year International (POYi) 2007
Winner of the All Roads Photography Program of the National Geographic Society for 2007
Awarded the Paola Biocca International Reportage Award 2008 by the International Journalism Festival, Italy
 Winner of first place in General News Story category in India Press Photo Contest 2008 by The Indian Express Ramnath Goenka Foundation
 Best Published Picture Story category in 2008, by the National Press Photographers Association
 Third place in the feature photography by National Headliner Awards, 2010
 First place in Portrait/Personality category, 2014 Atlanta Photojournalism Seminar Contest
 Finalist in the World Understanding Award category by Pictures of Year (POYi), 2011
 Award of Excellence in General News category by the Pictures of Year (POYi), 2011
 Second place in General News category by Media Federation of India, 2011
 First place in People in the News category, 2011 World Press Photo competition, 2012
 Third place in General News category, 2012 Atlanta Photojournalism Seminar Contest

References

External links

In Search of Objectivity in Photojournalism: A Lifetime Assignment, LensCulture
How I survived Libya
India's Rescue Operations in Quake-Devastated Nepal, Time
Kashmiri photojournalist bags 3 awards, The Hindu, 28 May 2005
Indian Press Photo Results announced, The Indian Express.
Altaf Qadri on the Deadly Standoff in Kashmir, Warshooter.

1976 births
Living people
Indian photojournalists
People from Srinagar
Kashmiri people
Journalists from Jammu and Kashmir
20th-century Indian journalists
Indian male journalists
20th-century Indian photographers
Photographers from Jammu and Kashmir
Qadiri order